Jordan Trovillion is an American actress and singer. She has appeared in Detroiters and Secrets in the Walls.

She grew up in Michigan and started acting on stage in school, later studying theater at the University of Michigan-Flint.

Filmography

References

External links
 

 Jordan Trovillion on Model Mayhem

Living people
Actresses from Cincinnati
21st-century American actresses
American film actresses
American television actresses
People from Genesee County, Michigan
Actresses from Michigan
University of Michigan–Flint alumni
Year of birth missing (living people)